Pliskin is a Jewish locational surname, which originally meant a person from the villages of Pliski, Belarus or Pliszki, Poland. The name may refer to:

Joseph Pliskin (born 1947), Israeli health researcher
Zelig Pliskin (born 1946), American rabbi and writer
Iroquois Pliskin, fictional character in the Metal Gear series

References

Slavic-language surnames
Jewish surnames